The Tallest Man on Earth is the self-titled five-song EP from the Swedish folk artist The Tallest Man on Earth. "Into the Stream" was later re-recorded for the album Shallow Grave.

On June 21, 2011, the EP was reissued on Gravitation and distributed by Dead Oceans. The reissue features the previously unreleased track "In the Pockets" and is exclusive to the vinyl version.

Track listing

References

2006 debut EPs
The Tallest Man on Earth albums